In California state elections, 2014 was the first year in which the top statewide offices were elected under the nonpartisan blanket primary, pursuant to Proposition 14, which passed with 53% voter approval in June 2010. Under this system, which first went into effect during the 2012 election year, all candidates will appear on the same ballot, regardless of party. In the primary, voters may vote for any candidate, regardless of their party affiliation. The top two finishers, regardless of party, then advance to face each other in the general election in November.

The 2014 elections for statewide offices also coincided with those for all of California's seats to the House of Representatives, all of the seats of the State Assembly, all even-numbered seats of the State Senate, and statewide ballot propositions.

The primary election was held on June 3, and the general election on November 4. Although the general election saw the California Republican Party lose every statewide election (including the gubernatorial race), the party did make gains in both houses of the California State Legislature, with a net gain of four seats in the Assembly and two seats in the Senate. In both cases, the Republican gains ended the supermajorities of the California Democratic Party in those chambers.

Congressional 

All 53 U.S. Representatives from California were up for election in 2014, but neither of the state's two U.S. Senate seats.

Constitutional officers

Overview

Governor 

Incumbent Democratic Governor Jerry Brown won re-election to a second consecutive and fourth overall term in office. Although governors are limited to lifetime service of two terms in office, Brown previously served as governor from 1975 to 1983, and the law only affects terms served after 1990.

Lieutenant Governor 

Incumbent Democratic Lieutenant Governor Gavin Newsom won re-election to a second term in office.

Attorney General 

Incumbent Democratic Attorney General Kamala Harris won re-election to a second term in office.

Secretary of State 

Incumbent Democratic Secretary of State Debra Bowen was term-limited out of office.

Treasurer 

Incumbent Democratic State Treasurer Bill Lockyer was term-limited out of office.

Controller 

Incumbent Democratic State Controller John Chiang was term-limited out of office.

Insurance Commissioner 

Incumbent Democratic Insurance Commissioner Dave Jones won re-election to a second term in office.

Superintendent of Public Instruction 

Incumbent Superintendent of Public Instruction Tom Torlakson won reelection to a second term in office. The office is nonpartisan.

Board of Equalization 
Incumbent Board of Equalization members Republican George Runner and Democrat Jerome Horton ran for re-election, while Republican Michelle Steel and Democrat Betty T. Yee were term-limited out of office.

District 1

District 2

District 3

District 4

State legislature

State Senate 

Voters in the 20 even-numbered districts of the California State Senate elected their representatives.

State Assembly 

Voters in all 80 of California's state assembly districts elected their representatives.

Statewide ballot propositions

June primary election 
The following propositions were on the June ballot:
 Proposition 41 - Passed
The Veterans Housing and Homeless Prevention Bond Act Of 2014 is a legislatively referred statute that authorizes $600 million in bonds for affordable multifamily housing for veterans and their families. Supporters argued that this would fund such housing for low income and homeless veterans, while opponents were concerned that it would divert funds from the bonds previously approved under Proposition 12 on 2008 to assist veterans in general who are purchasing properties.
 Proposition 42 - Passed
This initiative constitutional amendment requires local governments to comply with laws that provide public access to their body meetings and records of government officials. It also eliminates the reimbursement for the costs of such compliance. Supporters argued for the need for such open public access, while opponents disagreed with provisions that would impose the costs of compliance upon the local governments involved instead of the state.

November general election 
The following propositions have qualified for the November ballot:

 Proposition 1 - Passed
 The Safe, Clean, and Reliable Water Supply Act is a legislatively referred statute that authorizes bonds to upgrade California's water system. The original bill was going to be appear on the November 2010 ballot, but the California Legislature postponed the vote until now. This measure was then originally numbered as Proposition 43, but on August 13, the legislature passed a revised version of the proposal for the 2014 ballot to address issues of the ongoing statewide drought, and numbered this new one as Proposition 1. This updated proposal authorizes $7.12 billion in general obligation bonds, and reallocates $425 million of unused bond authority from prior water bond acts, for various state water supply infrastructure projects. Supporters believed that this will help provide safe and reliable supplies of water to farms, businesses and communities, especially during the current drought. Opponents argued that the proposed specific projects in the initiative are misplaced, saying that there is too much emphasis on building new dams, which does not really help to relieve the drought.
 Proposition 2 - Passed
This legislative constitutional amendment makes several changes relating to state's reserve policy. It, among others, establishes a replacement version of the Budget Stabilization Account (first enacted per Proposition 58 in 2004), in which it will annually receive 1.5% of the estimated amount of General Fund revenues for each respective fiscal year. The Act also creates another reserve fund for public schools funding (as mandated per Proposition 98 in 1988) called the Public School System Stabilization Account. This measure was then originally numbered as Proposition 44, but was then re-numbered as Proposition 2. Supporters argued that this provides a strong rainy day fund, while opponents disagreed (among others) with provisions setting a maximum amount of reserves that school districts could keep at the local level.
 Proposition 45 - Failed
Under this initiative, any health insurance rate change will need to be approved by the state's Insurance Commissioner before it can take effect. Any health insurer requesting such approval will need to provide information to justify their rate changes. The measure also provides procedures for public notice, disclosure, hearing, and subsequent judicial review for this approval process; it was different from similar states in allowing members of the public to sue the commissioner over approved rate hikes. Supporters believed that this will stop price gouging. Opponents were concerned about giving that much power to the Insurance Commissioner, who as an elected politician could be easily influenced be special interest groups.
 Proposition 46 - Failed
This initiative will require the regular drug and alcohol testing of doctors. Administration of this will be given to the California Medical Board. Doctors will also be required to report any other doctor suspected of being under the influence while on duty. In addition, doctors will be required to check the state's CURES (Controlled Substance Utilization Review and Evaluation System) prescription drug history database before prescribing certain controlled substances to patients. Furthermore, the $250,000 cap on pain and suffering damages in medical negligence lawsuits will be increased to account for inflation. Supporters argued that this will reduce medical negligence, while opponents were concerned that the cap increase in medical negligence lawsuits will eventually lead to higher health care costs.
 Proposition 47 - Passed
This initiative downgrades the sentencing classification, from felonies to misdemeanors, for the crimes of petty theft, receiving stolen property, and forging/writing bad checks when the value or amount involved is $950 or less. However, a person who has a previous conviction for crimes such as rape, murder or child molestation or is a registered sex offender will still get a felony sentence. In addition, people currently serving felony sentences for these crimes will be re-sentenced unless a court determines that they are an unreasonable public safety risk. The resulting net savings in the state's criminal justice system will then be applied to a new "Safe Neighborhoods and Schools Fund" for mental health and drug treatment programs, K-12 schools, and crime victims. Supporters argued that this will reduce spending and government waste in the state's overcrowded prisons; opponents argued that this could potentially release over 10,000 prisoners, reduce penalties for stealing guns and sex crimes, and overburden the state justice system.
 Proposition 48 - Failed
This was a referendum on Assembly Bill 277. Passed by the legislature and signed by the governor in July 2013, it ratified gaming compacts with the Northfork Rancheria of Mono Indians and the Wiyot Tribe. Under the compacts, the Northfork tribe were permitted to build a casino with 2000 slot machines in Madera County on land that was accepted into federal trust for gaming, instead of building one on their reservation near Yosemite. The Wiyot Tribe would have then receive a percentage of the revenue from the Northfork's casino, in exchange for not building one of their own on their land near the Humboldt Bay National Wildlife Refuge. The tribes were also given exemptions to the California Environmental Quality Act "in deference to tribal sovereignty". Supporters of the compacts argued that the proposed casino will bring jobs and tax money, as well as avoid potentially negative environmental impact in both Yosemite and Humboldt Bay; opponents said that this would have paved the way for massive off-reservation casinos.
 Proposition 49 - 'Removed from the ballot by order of the California Supreme Court
Originally put on the ballot by the state legislature, Proposition 49 would have been non-binding advisory question presented to voters, asking if the U.S. Congress should propose an amendment to the U.S. Constitution to overturn the U.S. Supreme Court's 2010 ruling in Citizens United v. Federal Election Commission''. In that case, the U.S. Supreme Court ruled that the government is prohibited from restricting campaign contributions and other political independent expenditures by corporations, associations, or labor unions. This proposition alone would have no binding legal effect, and it will only be submitted to Congress as a formal request; under Article Five of the U.S. Constitution, the process for amending the Constitution can only be initiated by either Congress or a national convention assembled at the request of the legislatures of at least two-thirds (at present 34) of the states. On August 11, the California Supreme Court ordered that the measure be pulled from the November ballot pending further state constitutional review: at issue is that the state legislature has no defined specific power to place such advisory measures on the ballot.

Local races
Local races included:

 A runoff in the San Diego mayoral special election was held on February 11. The special election was necessary following the resignation of Bob Filner on August 30, 2013. A primary election was held on November 19, 2013. Since no candidate received a majority of the vote in the first round, a runoff election was held between the top two vote-getters on February 11. In the runoff, Republican Kevin Faulconer defeated Democratic candidate David Alvarez.
 The San Jose mayoral election will determine the successor to incumbent Democratic Mayor Chuck Reed, who is term-limited out of office. A primary election was held on June 3. As no candidate received a majority of the vote, a runoff election will be held between the top two vote-getters, Dave Cortese and Sam Liccardo, on November 4.

References

External links 
California Elections and Voter Information from the California Secretary of State

 
California